Muntanna is an unincorporated community in Putnam County, in the U.S. state of Ohio.

History
Muntanna was platted in 1884. A post office was in operation at Muntanna between 1880 and 1907.

References

Unincorporated communities in Putnam County, Ohio
Unincorporated communities in Ohio